Jon Bradley (born January 13, 1981) is a former American football defensive tackle. He spent his first years in the league as a defensive tackle before switching to fullback in 2007 Lions mini-camp.

1981 births
Living people
American football defensive tackles
American football fullbacks
People from West Helena, Arkansas
Arkansas State Red Wolves football players
Tampa Bay Buccaneers players
Detroit Lions players